RG-59/U is a specific type of coaxial cable, often used for low-power video and RF signal connections. The cable has a characteristic impedance of 75 ohms, and a capacitance of around 20pF/ft (60pF/m). The 75 ohm impedance matches a dipole antenna in free space. RG  (for radio guide) was originally a unit indicator for bulk radio frequency (RF) cable in the U.S. military's Joint Electronics Type Designation System. The suffix /U means for general utility use. The number 59 was assigned sequentially. The RG unit indicator is no longer part of the JETDS system (MIL-STD-196E) and cable sold today under the RG-59 label does not necessarily meet military specifications.

RG-59 is often used at baseband video frequencies, such as composite video.  It may also be used for broadcast frequencies, but its high-frequency losses are too high to allow its use over long distances; in these applications, RG-6 or RG-11 are used instead.  In cases where the transmission distance is too long for these media, such options as UTP (unshielded twisted pair) or fiber optic can be used.

RG-59 coaxial cable is commonly packed with consumer equipment, such as VCRs or digital cable/satellite receivers. Manufacturers tend to include only RG-59 cables because it costs less than RG-6 does. However, given the short lengths provided (usually ), this is generally sufficient for its typical use.

RG-59 is frequently used to synchronize two digital audio devices, such as ADAT optical devices.  This is called word clock.

See also
 BNC connector
 Coaxial cable
 RG-58 – A similar cable but with an impedance of 50 or 52 ohms

References

Bibliography
 

Signal cables
Transmission lines